Antonín Švehla (15 April 1873, in Prague – 12 December 1933 in Prague) was a Czechoslovak politician. He served three terms as the prime minister of Czechoslovakia. He is regarded as one of the most important political figures of the First Czechoslovak Republic; he was the leader of the Agrarian Party, which was dominant within the Pětka, which was largely his own invention. Švehla is also credited with the slogan of the Pětka: "We have agreed that we will agree."

He supported professor T. G. Masaryk in his fight for Czechoslovak independence. 

The garden of the European Campus of Sciences Po Paris in Dijon, France is named "Garden of the Agrarians of Antonín Švehla (1873–1933)" in memory of Antonín Švehla.

References

Further reading
 Daniel E Miller, Forging Political Compromise: Antonín Švehla and the Czechoslovak Republican Party, 1918–1933, University or Pittsburgh Press, 1999.

See also

 First Republic of Czechoslovakia

1873 births
1933 deaths
Politicians from Prague
People from the Kingdom of Bohemia
Republican Party of Farmers and Peasants politicians
Prime Ministers of Czechoslovakia
Government ministers of Czechoslovakia
Members of the Revolutionary National Assembly of Czechoslovakia
Members of the Chamber of Deputies of Czechoslovakia (1920–1925)
Members of the Chamber of Deputies of Czechoslovakia (1925–1929)
Members of the Chamber of Deputies of Czechoslovakia (1929–1935)